Udelny (masculine), Udelnaya (feminine), or Udelnoye (neuter) is the name of several inhabited localities in Russia.

Urban localities
Udelnaya, Moscow Oblast, a suburban (dacha) settlement in Ramensky District of Moscow Oblast

Rural localities
Udelnoye, Kirov Oblast, a village in Shvarikhinsky Rural Okrug of Nolinsky District of Kirov Oblast
Udelnoye, Alexeyevsky Rural Okrug, Sovetsky District, Mari El Republic, a village in Alexeyevsky Rural Okrug of Sovetsky District of the Mari El Republic
Udelnoye, Vyatsky Rural Okrug, Sovetsky District, Mari El Republic, a village in Vyatsky Rural Okrug of Sovetsky District of the Mari El Republic
Udelnaya, Mari El Republic, a village in Gornoshumetsky Rural Okrug of Yurinsky District of the Mari El Republic